The Bargee is a 1964 British comedy film shot in Techniscope directed by Duncan Wood, and starring Harry H. Corbett, Hugh Griffith, Eric Sykes and Ronnie Barker. The screenplay was written by Ray Galton and Alan Simpson.

Plot

Hemel Pike and his cousin Ronnie are two boatmen operating a canal-boat and its butty for British Waterways on the Grand Union Canal. Although the canals are struggling due to declining traffic, Hemel refuses to give up his traditional lifestyle. He also enjoys his reputation as a Don Juan, with girlfriends all across the canal network, something of which Ronnie is envious.

Hemel and Ronnie set out from Brentford to Boxmoor, repeatedly encountering an inept "mariner" (Eric Sykes) in a small pleasure craft. At Rickmansworth, Hemel visits one of his lovers, a barmaid called Nellie, but he has to make a quick exit when she accidentally learns about his other girlfriends. Hemel and Ronnie reach Boxmoor where they deliver their cargo before travelling on empty towards Birmingham. En route, Hemel meets up with another girlfriend.

Hemel's next call is Leg O'Mutton Lock to meet Christine, the daughter of lock-keeper Joe Turnbull. Hemel thinks highly of Christine, but knows that Joe loathes the thought of his daughter becoming associated with a canal worker. On arrival, Ronnie takes Joe to the local pub to get him out of the way while Hemel and Christine get together. Christine, who hates the idea of living on a boat, attempts to persuade Hemel to leave the canal and get a job on land, but Hemel refuses, alarmed by her talk of marriage and settling down. Then he narrowly escapes from being caught by Joe who returns home drunk after being tricked into a drinking competition by Ronnie.

After Hemel and Ronnie have left for Birmingham, Joe discovers that Christine is pregnant. Dismayed and angry, and having learned from Christine that the father is one of the canal workers, Joe drains the canal pound, padlocks the lock gates, and attaches a home-made bomb, and announces that he will prevent any traffic from passing through until the father comes forward. After various attempts to get him to stop have failed, Hemel and Ronnie arrive and, seeing the commotion and Christine being harassed by the locals, Hemel admits that he is the father.

Joe allows Hemel to move in to his house until he and Christine can be married, and Hemel tries to find a job on land, but he misses the lifestyle and independence he enjoyed on the canals.

At their wedding reception, Christine tells Hemel that she has a wedding gift for him and takes him to the canal where he sees that his boats have been renamed Hemel and Christine. She tells him that Ronnie has learned that all working-boats are to be withdrawn from the canals in 18 months time, and that she will agree to live on the boats on the canal with him and their baby until they are withdrawn, so that his family, who have been on the canals since the beginning, will be there at the end as well.

Cast
 Harry H. Corbett as Hemel Pike
 Hugh Griffith as Joe Turnbull
 Eric Sykes as the Mariner
 Ronnie Barker as Ronnie
 Julia Foster as Christine Turnbull
 Miriam Karlin as Nellie Marsh
 Eric Barker as Mr Parkes, the Foreman
 Derek Nimmo as Dr. Scott
 Norman Bird as Albert Williams, the Waterways Supervisor
 Richard Briers as Tomkins
 Brian Wilde as Policeman
 Ronnie Brody as Ted Croxley
 George A. Cooper as Mr Williams, Office Official
 Ed Devereaux as Boat Man
 Wally Patch as Bargee
 Michael Robbins as Bargee
 Jo Rowbottom (credited as Jo Rowbotham) as Cynthia
 Grazina Frame as Office Secretary
 Una Stubbs as Bridesmaid
 Eileen Way as Onlooker
 Rita Webb as Onlooker and Wedding Guest
 Patricia Hayes as Onlooker
 Godfrey Winn as Announcer
 Edwin Apps as George the Barman

Release
The film opened at London's Empire Cinema on Leicester Square on 23 April 1964.

Reception
Kinematograph Weekly called the film a "money maker" for 1964.

In a 2019 review for the Radio Times, David Parkinson writes: "The poverty of the plot (in which Corbett's Lothario of the Locks is duped into matrimony) is nothing next to its intrinsic sexism. Corbett tuts and shrugs with characteristic melancholy, but to little effect."

References

External links
 
 

1964 films
1964 comedy films
British comedy films
Canals in fiction
Films shot at Associated British Studios
Films about infidelity
Films set in Hertfordshire
British pregnancy films
1960s English-language films
1960s British films